Donzel may refer to:

Doncel, a court appointment in late medieval Spain
Donzel, a village in Bernheze, Netherlands
Hugues-Fleury Donzel (1791–1850), French entomologist